James Barry (1659–1717) was an Irish politician.

Barry was returned for Rathcormack to the Irish House of Commons from 1689 until 1703, when he was also elected for Dungarvan. He chose to sit for latter and represented it until 1713. Subsequently, he became again Member of Parliament (MP) for Rathcormack. In 1715, Barry stood a second time for Dungarvan, a seat he finally held until his death two years later.

References

 https://web.archive.org/web/20090601105535/http://www.leighrayment.com/commons/irelandcommons.htm

1659 births
1717 deaths
Irish MPs 1689
Irish MPs 1692–1693
Irish MPs 1695–1699
Irish MPs 1703–1713
Irish MPs 1713–1714
Irish MPs 1715–1727
Members of the Parliament of Ireland (pre-1801) for County Cork constituencies
Members of the Parliament of Ireland (pre-1801) for County Waterford constituencies